Shahrak-e Montazeri (also Romanized as Shahrak-e Montaz̧erī) is a village in Naseri Rural District, Khanafereh District, Shadegan County, Khuzestan Province, Iran. At the 2006 census, its population was 2,133, in 375 families.

References 

Populated places in Shadegan County